AO Mensae is a single variable star in the southern circumpolar constellation of Mensa. It is too faint to be viewed with the naked eye, having an apparent visual magnitude that ranges from 9.96 down to 10.18. The star is 128 light years distant from the Sun based on parallax, and is drifting further away with a radial velocity of +16 km/s. It is a member of the Beta Pictoris moving group, a loose association of young stars moving through the galaxy.

This is an orange-hued K-type main-sequence star with a stellar classification of K4Ve, where the 'e' suffix indicates emission features in the spectrum. It is young star and an X-ray source, one of the brightest such X-ray emitters in the solar neighborhood, and is categorized as a BY Draconis variable, although there is some uncertainty in this assignment. It is spinning with a period of 2.7 days and is about 23 million years old. The star has 69% of the mass of the Sun and 91% of the Sun's radius. It is radiating 26% of the luminosity of the Sun on average, at an effective temperature of 4,384 K.

References

K-type main-sequence stars
BY Draconis variables
Astronomical X-ray sources

Mensa (constellation)
045081
029964
Mensae, AO
Beta Pictoris moving group
Durchmusterung objects